Hason Raja is a 2017 Bangladeshi film directed by Ruhul Amin, starring Mithun Chakraborty and Raima Sen.

Plot
The film is about Hason Raja, a flamboyant, ruthless zamindar (aristocrat) from Sylhet, who falls in love with Dilaram, who transforms him. He later becomes a poet, singing songs and wandering all across Bangladesh. Hinduism, Buddhism and Sufism influenced his songs. He was the inspiration of the Nobel Prize winner Rabindranath Tagore, who mentioned Raja at several conferences worldwide and he remains one of the greatest and most powerful icons of Bengali culture today.

Cast

Production 
Fascinated by the legend of Hason Raja, the UK-based director Ruhul Amin wanted to make it as a feature film. With more than 15 documentaries and feature films for the BBC behind him, Ruhul wanted Mithun Chakraborty as Raja and Raima Sen as his muse, Dilaram. Amin met Chakraborty in 2007 and finalized the title role, while Sen agreed to be a part of the film a year later. As Amin could not find a producer for the project in 2003, his friends and the Bangladeshi community based at England funded the film and officially it went to floors on 22 February 2011.

Soundtrack

The music was composed by Bappi Lahiri and Debojyoti Mishra. The background music is also by Mishra.

References

External links
 

2017 films
Films scored by Bappi Lahiri
Films shot in Bangladesh
Bengali-language Bangladeshi films
Films scored by Debojyoti Mishra
Bangladeshi biographical films
2010s Bengali-language films